Zulfiqar Ali (born 1965) is former mayor of Rochdale, in the north west of England. He was born in Bradford.  He took office in 2010.

Ali is the chairman of Reach BCS, Rochdale, Greater Manchester. 

In 2008, he was awarded the Queen's Award for Enterprise Promotion.

References

External links
 Mayor of Rochdale article
 RDA Board
 Being Top Boss
 RDA and Enterprise for All
 Red Hot name in Rochdale
 Why did the Queen Award them

Mayors of Rochdale
British businesspeople
Living people
Queen's Award for Enterprise Promotion (2008)
1965 births